Munshi Abdul Majid (born 1952) is an Afghan politician. He is an ethnic Pashtun from Baghlan Province.  In the 1990s he served as an official in the Afghan Interior Ministry; he is also known as a writer and orator in Persian and Pashto.

In 2005 he was appointed governor of Badakhshan Province, where in 2007 he led a successful opium eradication campaign. The opium poppy cultivation zones were reduced to 200 hectares, whereas they had reached 15,607 hectares in 2004. However, the fall of opium prices might have also played an important part in this decrease. In addition, the eradication campaign caused a worsening of the security situation in Badakhshan. In April 2009, protests erupted over Governor Majid's alleged abuse of power, and he was removed from his post. In 2010, he was appointed governor of Baghlan Province.

Governor Majid is a high-ranking member of Hezb-e-Islami Gulbuddin, and he is allegedly involved in strengthening the party and rebuilding its communications network across the country. He is close to fellow Hezb-e-Islami member Juma Khan Hamdard.

Notes

1952 births
Living people
Governors of Badakhshan Province
Pashtun people
People from Baghlan Province
Hezb-e Islami Gulbuddin politicians
Governors of Baghlan Province